"No, Honestly" is a song written, performed and produced by Lynsey de Paul, that was the theme for London Weekend Television's comedy series of the same name, although the single release was a slightly different version from that used for the TV theme.

History
The song was the first released on 18 October 1974 on the Jet Records label established by Don Arden. It peaked at No. 7 on the UK Singles Chart, and No. 4 on the Northern Ireland chart at the beginning of December that year. The B-side of the single was de Paul's version of "Central Park Arrest"; a hit earlier in the year that she had originally written for the female group, Thunderthighs. In 1975, de Paul received an Ivor Novello Award for Best Theme from a Radio or TV Production.
An instrumental version of the song was used as the theme for the second series, Yes, Honestly.

Other recordings
It was covered by the Brazilian singer Jeannie, on the various artists album, Discoteca Hippopotamus, in 1975. A Danish version of "No Honestly" was released as a single by Vivian in 1976. The Bruce Baxter Orchestra, The Ray Hartley Orchestra and The Starshine Orchestra have performed versions for albums of famous TV theme songs.

References

External links
 

1974 songs
Lynsey de Paul songs
Songs written by Lynsey de Paul
Jet Records singles
Comedy television theme songs